In vitro refers to studies performed with microorganisms, cells, or biological molecules outside their normal biological context.

In vitro may also refer to:

 In vitro fertilization, a process of fertilization where an egg is combined with sperm outside the body
 In Vitro, a fictional genetically engineered subspecies of humans in the science fiction television series Space: Above and Beyond
 In Vitro (journal), a scientific journal